The Medford metropolitan area is a metropolitan area in the U.S. state of Oregon centered on the principal city of Medford, Oregon. The U.S. Office of Management and Budget (OMB) identifies it as the Medford, OR Metropolitan Statistical Area, a metropolitan statistical area used by the United States Census Bureau (USCB) and other entities. The OMB defines the area as comprising all of Jackson County, including Medford, Ashland and Central Point. The Medford metropolitan area also includes Grants Pass in neighboring Josephine County, though the OMB excludes it.

Medford-Grants Pass, Oregon Combined Statistical Area
The USCB includes Medford and Grants Pass as a combined statistical area called the Medford-Grants Pass, Oregon Combined Statistical Area, comprising both Jackson and Josephine counties. The area's population is estimated at 285,919 in 2010, making it the second largest combined statistical area and the fourth largest metropolitan area in Oregon, after Portland, Salem, and Eugene–Springfield.

See also
 Oregon statistical areas

References 

Metropolitan areas of Oregon
Combined statistical areas of the United States